Paulistano is the Brazilian Portuguese term for the characteristic accent spoken in São Paulo, Brazil's largest and richest city, and some neighboring areas in the São Paulo Macrometropolis. It is the most influential accent in the country, recognizable as "correct" by 93% of Brazilians according to a 1997 study. The Paulistano accent is dominant in Brazilian mass media and is often associated with "standard" Brazilian Portuguese.

History
The Paulistano dialect was influenced by immigrants who arrived in the city from the late 19th century onwards, chiefly the Italians. In the early 20th century, Italian and its dialects were widely spoken in São Paulo and they eventually merged into locally spoken Portuguese.

Phonological features
Example:   / 
 Word-final  in infinitives is often not pronounced at all. Example:  .

See also
 Brazilian Portuguese
 Portuguese dialects
 Portuguese phonology
 São Paulo

References

Brazilian Portuguese
City colloquials
Culture in São Paulo